Elections were held in Elgin County, Ontario on October 25, 2010 in conjunction with municipal elections across the province.

Elgin County Council

Aylmer

Bayham

Central Elgin

Dutton/Dunwich

Malahide

Southwold

West Elgin

2010 Ontario municipal elections
Elgin County